Edilberto Campadese (28 March 1915 – 2 January 2003) was an Italian bobsledder who competed in the late 1940s. At the 1948 Winter Olympics in St. Moritz, he finished sixth in the four-man and eighth in the two-man event respectively.

References

Sources
1948 bobsleigh two-man results
1948 bobsleigh four-man results
Bobsleigh two-man results: 1932-56 and since 1964 
Wallechinsky, David (1984). The Complete Book of the Olympics: 1896 - 1980. New York: Penguin Books. pp. 558, 560, 577.
Edilberto Campadese's profile at Sports Reference.com

External links
 

1915 births
2003 deaths
Olympic bobsledders of Italy
Bobsledders at the 1948 Winter Olympics
Italian male bobsledders